The Myanmar News Agency (abbreviated MNA) is the official state news agency of the Myanmar government, based in Yangon, Burma. It was established in 1963 after the 1962 Burmese coup d'état as News Agency Burma (NAB). It is currently under the News and Periodical Enterprise of the Ministry of Information. MNA has the sole right to take pictures of government-arranged events, including meetings of opposition leader Aung San Suu Kyi and government officials. Local Burmese weeklies rely on the MNA for pictures to be carried with their stories.

The agency is run by the Ministry of Information and censors most national and foreign news. It falls under the News and Periodicals Enterprise, along with three major newspapers.

The agency uses feeds from Reuters and the Press Trust of India.

The MNA has news exchange agreements with international news agencies, including Xinhua, ITAR-TASS, Yonhap, Kyodo, Tanjug, ANTARA, KPL and VNA.

See also
Censorship in Burma
Media of Burma

Notes

References

 Altbach, Philip (1992). Publishing and development in the Third World. H. Zell. .
 Ang, Peng & Ramanathan, Sankaran (2000). Communication in ASEAN. Asian Media Information and Communication Centre. .
 Gupta, Amita (2006). Concise Encyclopaedia Of India Vol. 3. Atlantic Publishers & Distributors. .
 Gunaratne, Shelton (2000). Handbook of the media in Asia. Sage Publications. .
 Shrivastava, K (2007). News agencies from pigeon to internet. Sterling Publishers Pvt. Ltd. .

1963 establishments in Burma
Government agencies established in 1963
News agencies based in Myanmar
Mass media in Yangon
Government agencies of Myanmar